Fauna of Germany may refer to:
 List of fish in Germany
 List of birds of Germany
 List of mammals of Germany

See also
 Outline of Germany

References

Fauna of Germany